Borová is a municipality and village in Svitavy District in the Pardubice Region of the Czech Republic. It has about 1,000 inhabitants.

History

The first written mention of Borová is from 1349.

References

Villages in Svitavy District